The National Museum of the Comoros (in French: Le musée national des Comores) is a national museum in the capital city of Moroni on the island of Grande Comore in the Comoros, presenting the country's cultural heritage.

The museum was established in 1989 and has four exhibit rooms with collections on:

 History, Art, Archeology and Religion
 Volcanology and Earth Science
 Oceanography and Natural Science
 Social and Cultural Anthropology.

The museum is part of the National Center of Documentation and Scientific Research (CNDRS). Two smaller regional museums on the islands of Anjouan and Mohéli are associated with the main museum.

See also
 List of museums in the Comoros
 List of national museums

References

External links
 Le musée national des Comores 

1989 establishments in the Comoros
Museums established in 1989
Museums in the Comoros
Comoros
Buildings and structures in Moroni, Comoros